Ben Tankard (born January 10, 1964) is an American gospel/smooth jazz musician, producer, and arranger.

Biography 

Tankard's father was a minister and his mother a missionary. In church, he played drums at an early age. He played tuba in school and received a basketball scholarship. Although he was selected in the NBA draft, he hurt his knee before the season started. During a period of homelessness, he went to church and was inspired by a revival service to turn his life around. He began playing keyboards, recorded Keynote Speaker (1990) for Tribute, and started to learn about arranging and record production. He followed with  He has worked with Gerald Albright, Twinkie Clark, Fred Hammond, John P. Kee, Shirley Murdock, Kelly Price, and Take 6.

Tankard discovered a third-grade school teacher named Yolanda Adams and signed her to his indy Tribute label. He produced her albums Through the Storm, Save the World, More Than A Melody, and Yolanda... Live in Washington. They collaborated on over 40 compositions. He credits her voice for helping to bring his production style and keyboard playing to a large audience.

He won Stellar Awards' Best Instrumental Album in 2010 for Mercy, Mercy, Mercy.

In 2012, Ben Tankard/ Full Tank was nominated by the Soul Train Music Awards for Best Contemporary Jazz Artist.

Discography
 All Keyed Up (1989)
 Keynote Speaker (1990)
 Keys to Life (1991)
 An Instrumental Christmas (1991)
 Sunday Drivin (1993)
 Play Me in Your Key (1994)
 Instrumentally Yours (1996)
 Git Yo Prayze On w/Tribe of Benjamin (1997)
 Raize Da Praise by Tribe of Benjamin (1999)
 The Minstrel (1999)
 Christmas Love (2000)
 Song of Solomon (2001)
 Play a Lil' Song for Me (2003)
 Piano Prophet (2004)
 Let's Get Quiet: The Smooth Jazz Experience (2007)
 Mercy, Mercy, Mercy (2009)
 Full Tank (2012)
 Thicker Than Water-The Church Picnic (2013)
 Full Tank 2 (2015)
 Full Tank 3: CanTANKerous (2017)Tankard, Ben. "Full Tank 3: Cantankerous". Ben-Jammin' / Universal Music. 12 May 2017
 Rise! (2018) 
 Shine!'' (2021)

References

External links
 Official site

1964 births
Living people
African-American songwriters
Songwriters from Florida
American performers of Christian music
Smooth jazz pianists
21st-century American keyboardists
21st-century pianists
21st-century African-American musicians
20th-century African-American people